Joseph Edward Gosek (born March 11, 1956 in Oswego, New York), is a Supermodified race car driver. He also raced in the 1996 Indianapolis 500, finishing 22nd. Gosek was nicknamed 'Double-O Joe' for his traditional use of car number '00.'

Gosek has been victorious in numerous races at the famed Oswego Speedway in Oswego, NY, including its crown jewel; the International Classic 200, which he has won three times. Gosek is also a multi-time champion on the touring International Supermodified Association.

IRL IndyCar Series

Indy 500 results

References

1956 births
American Speed Association drivers
Living people
Indianapolis 500 drivers
IndyCar Series drivers
People from Oswego, New York
Racing drivers from New York (state)
USAC Silver Crown Series drivers
World of Outlaws drivers